Basiri (died 1534, Khorasan), was a prominent poet in the 16th century. He left the Timurid court and found patronage in Constantinople (now Istanbul), where he wrote poetry for Ottoman sultans. Basiri brought the poetic works of Jami and Nava'i to the Ottoman court.

Biography
Basiri's place of birth is disputed. Both Aşık Çelebi and Qinalizade state Khorasan, while Latifi and Ahdi state his origins were in "Ajam" or the fringes of "Ajam". He was known as Alaca because of his skin disease (leprosy).

A Persian émigré from the Timurid court, Basiri emigrated to the Aq Qoyunlu Confederation. Basiri wrote for the Aq Qoyunlu rulers and in 1487 traveled to Herat, joining Jami and Nava'i.

After visiting Constantinople (now Istanbul) in 1491, Basiri took the opportunity to join a mission to Bayezid II, and quickly gained the patronage of the Ottoman sultan. He brought the works of Nava'i and Jami to the Ottoman Empire. Basiri wrote poetry in Turkish and Persian, and it was in Persian that he wrote two lines mourning Jami's death. Basiri died in 1534.

Notes

References

Sources

16th-century Persian-language poets
16th-century Iranian poets
1543 deaths
16th-century writers from the Ottoman Empire
15th-century writers from the Ottoman Empire
Poets of the Aq Qoyunlu
Iranian emigrants to the Ottoman Empire
Poets from the Timurid Empire